The Adecmac soccer league, also known as "Asociación Deportiva y Cultural de Ex alumnos del Colegio Madrid A.C." is an amateur soccer league, formed by former students of the Mexican-Spanish republican high school "Colegio Madrid" in Mexico City.

History
The league was created in 1972 in the "Colegio Madrid" high school grounds. Later, in 1974-1978 the league became the SECMAC, and played in the grounds of the Club América. From 1978 to 1980 the league had to look for a new soccer field in Tepepan and finally the league ended up in some soccer fields in the Ajusco mountain in the outskirts of Mexico City.

Celebrities
The Adecmac amateur soccer league has distinguished from other Mexican leagues because it has had very important celebrities from the field of art as regular members such as the actors Diego Luna, Gael García Bernal, Jose Maria de Tavira, Osvaldo Benavides, Martin Altomaro, the international famous artists Gabriel Orozco and Ruben Ortiz Torres, the architect Mauricio Rocha, etc., and soccer ex-professional players such as Felix Fernandez and François Oman-Biyik.

Major teams
Major teams, both past and present, include:

Club deportivo sahara
Mixcoac
El Cid
Andorra
San Sebastian
Ibiza
Cabra
Cadiz
Celta de Vigo
Alcorcón

External links
official site of the adecmac soccer league

1972 establishments in Mexico
Association football leagues in Mexico
Sports competitions in Mexico City
Sports leagues established in 1972
Football in Mexico City